Rivels are an ingredient in some types of soup, often a chicken-based soup (archetypically chicken corn soup) or potato soup.  Rivels are common in Pennsylvania Dutch cooking. They are composed primarily of egg and wheat flour, which is cut together to create small dumpling-like pieces.

References

Dumplings
Pennsylvania Dutch cuisine